This is a list of public art in Kensington Gardens, one of the Royal Parks of London.

When the contemporary sculptor Anish Kapoor held an exhibition of his work in the gardens in 2010 he remarked that they are "the best site in London for a piece of art, probably [the best] in the world".


City of Westminster

Albert Memorial

Royal Borough of Kensington and Chelsea

Kensington Palace

See also
 List of public art in Hyde Park, London
 List of public art in Kensington

References

Bibliography

 

 

Kensington Gardens
Kensington Gardens